Theater Die Kleine Freiheit was a theatre in Munich, Bavaria, Germany. It was closed in November 1996.

Theatres in Munich
Maxvorstadt